The USOC Coach of the Year awards are given annually by the United States Olympic Committee to the top coaches in Olympic and Paralympic sports. One award is given in each of five categories:
National Coach
Developmental Coach
Paralympic Coach
Volunteer Coach
Doc Councilman Science Award
Nominees for the awards are selected by the national governing bodies for Olympic, Paralympic, and Pan American Games sports and their affiliated sports organizations. Members of the media vote for the top five nominees in each category. Category winners are then selected by a special USOC panel.

USOC Olympic Coach of the Year winners

1996 – Tara VanDerveer, U.S. Olympic Women's Basketball Coach
1997 – Frank Carroll, Olympic Figure Skating Coach
1998 – Ben Smith, U.S. Olympic Women's Ice Hockey Coach
1999 – Chris Carmichael, Cycling Coach
2000 – Richard Quick, U.S. Olympic Women's Swimming Coach
2001-02 – Pete del’Guidice, U.S. Snowboarding Coach
2003 – Lloyd Woodhouse, USA Shooting National Team Coach
2004 – Mike Candrea, USA Softball Women's National Team Coach
2005 – Eddie Reese, USA Swimming Men's National Team Coach
2006 – Bud Keene, U.S. Snowboarding Coach
2007 – Guy Baker, USA Water Polo National Team Coach
2008 – Hugh McCutcheon, USA Men's Volleyball National Team Coach
2009 – Bob Bradley, U.S. Men's Soccer Team Coach
2010 – Brian Shimer, U.S. Men's Bobsled Head Coach
2011 – Rick Bower, U.S. Snowboarding Halfpipe Coach
2012 – Adam Krikorian, U.S. Women's National Waterpolo Head Coach
2013 – Erik Flora, Alaska Pacific University Nordic Ski Club Head Coach
2014 – Skogen Sprang, U.S. Slopestyle Skiing Team Head Coach
2015 – Craig Parnham, U.S. Women's National Field Hockey Team coach
Co-2016 – Geno Auriemma, U.S. Olympic Women’s Basketball Team coach
Co-2016 – Aimee Boorman, U.S. Olympic Women’s Artistic Gymnastics Team
2017 – Bill Zadick, U.S. Freestyle World Wrestling Team Coach
2018 - Jason Cork, U.S. National Cross-Country Ski Team coach
2019 - KiSik Lee, U.S. Olympic Archery coach
2020 - Greg Massialas, USA Fencing

USOC Developmental Coach of the Year winners

1996 – Jeff Shaffer, Diving - University of Southern California
1997 – Dianne Holum, Speedskating
1998 – Mike Stafford, Boxing - Millvale Golden Gloves Gym
1999 – Tom Healy, Northbrook (ILL.) Speedskating Club
2000 – Fred Zimny, USA Luge
2001-02 – Mike Eaves, U.S. National Under-18 Hockey Team
2003 – Bob Fraley, Fresno State University Track and Field
2004 – Dwayne Miller, Norfolk Real Deal Track Club
2005 – Tammy Gambill, U.S Figure Skating
2006 – Mark Mitchell and Peter Johansson, U.S. Figure Skating
2007 – Paul Yetter, USA Swimming
2008 – Rajul Sheth, Table Tennis
2009 – John Wingfield, Director and Head Coach of USA Diving National Training Center
2010 – Michael Nyitray, Bowling - United States Bowling Congress
2011 – James Hrbek, USA Judo
2012 – Michael Nyitray, Bowling - United States Bowling Congress
2013 – Kathleen Johnson, Triathlon
2014 – George Ryals, Archery Learning Center
2015 – Brett Wolf, Menomonee Judo Club
2016 – Kim Zmeskal-Burdette, USA Gymnastics
2017 - none
2018 - Leandro Spina, US Sailing
2019 - BethAnn Chamberlain, U.S. Paralympic Nordic Skiing Team
2020 - Dana Skelton, USA Swimming

USOC Paralympic Coach of the Year winners

2004 – Mike Hulett, USA Women's Sitting Volleyball Team coach
2005 – Randi Smith, U.S. Paralympic Archery Team Head Coach
2006 – Julie O'Neill, U.S. Paralympic Swim Team Head Coach
2007 – Adam Bleakney, U.S. Paralympic Wheelchair Track coach
2008 – Ken Armbruster, U.S. Paralympic Goalball Head Coach
2009 – Scott Moore, Denver Judo coach
2010 – Ray Watkins, U.S. Paralympic Alpine Ski Team
2011 – Dave Denniston, Paralympic Swimming Head Coach
2012 – Tom Franke, Paralympic Swimming Head Coach
2013 – Adam Bleakney, U.S. Paralympic Track & Field coach
2014 – Brian Loeffler, Swimming, U.S. Paralympic Swimming Team coach
2015 – John Devorss, Salem Tennis and Swim Club
2016 – Adam Bleakney, U.S. Paralympic Track & Field coach
2017 – Eileen Carey, Paralympic Nordic skiing coach
2018 – Gary Colliander, Paralympic Nordic Skiing coach
2019 – Wesley Johnson, U.S. Paratriathlon coach
2020 – Michel Assouline, U.S. Para Equestrian Dressage Team coach

USOC Volunteer Coach of the Year winners

2003 – Carol Hardemon, Metro Dade Track Club
2004 – Barry Hunter, D.C. Boxing Coach
2005 – Cindi Hart, IndySpeed Sport Club Head Coach
2006 – Booker Woods, LA Jets Track and Field Head Coach
2007 – Sherman Nelson, USA Taekwondo coach
2008 – Rita Gladstone, Area Tennis League Coordinator
2009 – Brian McCutcheon, Taekwondo coach and Oahu Taekwondo Center Instructor
2010 – Dave Farmer, Aurora (Colo.) Saracens Rugby Club Coach
2011 – Tom Waga, Brigham Young University Rugby coach
2012 – Don Showalter, USA Basketball, Men's Developmental National Team coach
2013 – Bienvenido “Benny” Roman, USA Boxing Training Camp coach
2014 – Kathleen Stevenson, Oklahoma Storm Junior Olympic Archer Development Team coach
2015 – Carl Cepuran, Glen Ellyn Speedskating
2016 – Tom Miller, Adirondack Speedskating Club
2017 – none
2018 – Mary Hodge, USA Para Powerlifting
2019 – Daniel Greene, Madison Speedskating Club
2020 – Cherise Wilkins, US Speedskating

Doc Councilman Science Award winners

2003 – James E. "Doc" Counsilman, Swimming
2004 – Dr. Joe Vigil, Track and Field
2005 – Dr. Kyle Pierce, Weightlifting
2006 – Kat Arbour, Figure Skating
2007 – Sean O'Neill, Table Tennis
2008 – Dave Bennett, Wrestling
2009 – Heidi Thibert, Figure Skating
2010 – Grant Schaffner, Skeleton
2011 – Neal Henderson, Cycling
2012 – Doug Eng, Tennis
2013 – Gordon Uehling III, Tennis
2014 – Dave Hamilton, U.S. Women’s National Field Hockey Team
2015 – Warren Pretorius, Tennis Analytics
2016 – Derek Davis, USA Archery
2017 – none
2018 – Ingmar Jungnickel, US Speedskating
2019 – Andrew Stuart, US Speedskating
2020 – Jeff Lackie, U.S. Ski & Snowboard

See also
United States Olympic Hall of Fame

References

External links
USOC Coach of the Year

United States at the Olympics
United States at the Paralympics
 
Coaching awards
American sports trophies and awards